Kofanovka is a rural locality in Soldatsky Selsoviet Rural Settlement, Fatezhsky District, Kursk Oblast, Russia. Population:

Geography 
The village is located on the Zhuravchik River (a right tributary of the Ruda in the basin of the Svapa), 96 km from the Russia–Ukraine border, 41 km north-west of Kursk, 10 km south-west of the district center – the town Fatezh, 8.5 km from the selsoviet center – Soldatskoye.

 Climate
Kofanovka has a warm-summer humid continental climate (Dfb in the Köppen climate classification).

Transport 
Kofanovka is located 8.5 km from the federal route  Crimea Highway as part of the European route E105, 11 km from the road of regional importance  (Fatezh – Dmitriyev), on the road of intermunicipal significance  (Alisovo-Pokrovskoye – Kofanovka), 34.5 km from the nearest railway halt 552 km (railway line Navlya – Lgov-Kiyevsky).

The rural locality is situated 44 km from Kursk Vostochny Airport, 160 km from Belgorod International Airport and 238 km from Voronezh Peter the Great Airport.

References

Notes

Sources

Rural localities in Fatezhsky District